The 1926–27 Rugby Football League season was the 32nd season of rugby league football.

Season summary

Swinton won their first Championship by beating St. Helens Recs 13–8 in the play-off final.

St. Helens Recs had finished the regular season as league leaders.

Oldham beat Swinton 26–7 to win the Challenge Cup.

The league increased to 29 clubs with the addition of Castleford and Pontypridd.

St.Helens Recs won the Lancashire League, and Hull F.C. won the Yorkshire League. St. Helens beat St. Helens Recs 10–2 to win the Lancashire Cup, and Huddersfield beat Wakefield Trinity 10–3 to win the Yorkshire County Cup.

Championship

Championship play-off

Semifinals:
    
St Helens Recreation 33 beat St Helens 0.
    
Swinton 23 beat Wigan 3.

Final:
    
Swinton 13 beat St Helens Recreation 8.

Challenge Cup

In the Challenge Cup tournament's final Oldham faced Swinton. It was the first radio broadcast of the Challenge Cup final by the BBC. Oldham won 26–7 in the final played at Wigan in front of a crowd of 33,448. This was Oldham's fourth consecutive appearance in the final and their second win in that period.  It was their seventh overall appearance in a Challenge Cup Final and their third success overall.

References

Sources
1926-27 Rugby Football League season at wigan.rlfans.com
The Challenge Cup at The Rugby Football League website

1926 in English rugby league
1927 in English rugby league
Northern Rugby Football League seasons